The Shaw Theatre is a theatre in Somers Town, in the London Borough of Camden. It is a part of the Pullman London St Pancras hotel, located off Euston Road.

St Pancras library
Before being refurbished in 1998, the Shaw Theatre originally opened its doors in 1971 as a purpose built theatre within the St Pancras library. The opening production was the show Zigger Zagger with a cast that included Barrie Rutter and Paula Wilcox. In 1972, Simon Ward and Sinéad Cusack appeared in Romeo and Juliet. Later in the same year Vanessa Redgrave, Nyree Dawn Porter and Windsor Davies starred in Twelfth Night. Other stars who appeared in the theatre's early days included Ian McKellen, Mia Farrow, Julia McKenzie and Raymond Francis. The theatre hosted a series of 'Sunday nights at the Shaw', with many notable actors including Judi Dench, Dame Flora Robson, Patricia Routledge and Michael Williams. It also hosted numerous productions by the National Youth Theatre.

In 1985, the theatre played host to stars from the rock and pop world rehearsing for the Live Aid concert. Notably, Queen rehearsed their legendary Live Aid set at the Shaw.

The theatre is now part of the four-star Pullman London St Pancras hotel operated by the large French hotel chain AccorHotels. It was originally known as the Library Theatre; its current name is in honour of George Bernard Shaw.

Library closure and refurbishment
After the 1998 refurbishment it was reopened by Artistic director Mike Redwood in 2001 with an inaugural season including Chekov, Gogol and Snow White a Pantomime. The Shaw has 446 seats and two large foyers, four large dressing rooms for up to 60 people and extensive high quality backstage facilities which include a workshop space and laundry facilities.

Notable musicians, actors and comedians who have performed at the Shaw Theatre include Dionne Warwick, Kerry Ellis, Eartha Kitt, Boy George, Van Morrison, Harry Connick Jr., Ron Moody and Janie Dee, whose concert included a surprise performance by Sir Andrew Lloyd Webber. The successful An Evening With ... nights' guests included Tony Benn, Ann Widdecombe, Sir John Mortimer and Nicholas Parsons; the latter has also recorded his radio show Just a Minute at the Shaw.

For members of the public there is disabled access, cloakroom facilities and a bar serving drinks and refreshments. The venue is also used for exhibitions.

The Shaw Theatre's policy in 2009 was to present, as a receiving house, high quality drama from funded regional theatre and independent theatre companies for short to medium length runs and short term hires. The theatre is also in demand from New York City-based Broadway and off-Broadway producers.

Fire
On 9 March 2018, a fire broke out on stage at the Shaw Theatre. Six fire crews attended with 35 firefighters, and the blaze was brought under control after one hour and fifty minutes.

References

External links 

Theatres in the London Borough of Camden
George Bernard Shaw